Beaconsfield railway station is a railway station in the town of Beaconsfield, Buckinghamshire, England. It is served by Chiltern Railways.

History
The station was opened on 2 April 1906 as part of the Great Western and Great Central Joint Railway. The station layout was four tracks, with two through lines and two platform lines. British Rail removed the through lines early in 1974. The station was transferred from the Western Region of British Rail to the London Midland Region on 24 March 1974.

In the early 2000s the station car park was made into a two-storey car park. In March 2008 the upper deck was closed for work to start on adding a third storey. This opened on 1 September 2008, increasing the total parking spaces to 696.

Services
All trains are operated by Chiltern Railways. The current off-peak services are:

 1 calls at  only.
 1 train per hour to 
 1 train per hour to 

Image gallery

References

External links

 Chiltern Railways

Railway station
Former Great Western and Great Central Joint Railway stations
Railway stations in Buckinghamshire
Railway stations in Great Britain opened in 1906
Railway stations served by Chiltern Railways